The Brunnistock is a mountain of the Urner Alps, overlooking the eastern side of the Surenen Pass, in the Swiss canton of Uri. With a height of 2,952 metres above sea level, the Brunnistock is the highest mountain of the range lying north of the Surenen Pass. On the north-west side lies a glacier named Blüemlisalpfirn.

The closest locality is Attinghausen on the eastern foot of the mountain.

References

External links
 Brunnistock on Hikr

Mountains of the Alps
Mountains of Switzerland
Mountains of the canton of Uri